The 1919–20 Montreal Canadiens season was the team's 11th season and third as a member of the National Hockey League (NHL). The Canadiens opened their new Mount Royal Arena built to replace burnt-down Jubilee Rink.

The Toronto NHL franchise was now operated by a new group and known as the Toronto St. Patricks. A Quebec team was active this season, meaning a four-team league operated, and players from the Quebec NHA team were 'returned' to the new Quebec Bulldogs NHL team. The Canadiens lost Joe Malone and Jack McDonald to the Bulldogs.

Harry Cameron joined the Canadiens from Ottawa and Howard McNamara re-joined the Canadiens after not playing since 1917 with the Toronto 228th Battalion, and serving in the Canadian army. Don Smith, who had last played for the Canadiens in 1914–15, returned after serving in the army, last playing for the Montreal Wanderers in 1915–16.

Regular season
The Mount Royal Arena was not ready for the start of the season, and the Canadiens started their season on the road. The home opener  was held January 10, and Newsy Lalonde used the occasion to celebrate with six goals in a 14–7 drubbing of the Toronto St. Patricks.

On March 3, the Montreal Canadiens pummeled the Quebec Bulldogs 16–3, setting an all-time
record for goals by one team.

Georges Vezina came third in the league in goals against average of 4.66 per game. Newsy Lalonde led the Canadiens in offence, scoring 37 goals and 9 assists to place second in league scoring to Joe Malone.

The Canadiens picked up their scoring from the previous season, but gave up more goals on defence and failed to make the playoffs for the first time since the 1914–15 season.

Final standings

Record vs. opponents

Schedule and results

Second half

Playoffs

There was no playoffs as the Ottawa Senators won both halves of the season.

Player statistics

Skaters
Note: GP = Games played, G = Goals, A = Assists, Pts = Points, PIM = Penalties in minutes

†Denotes player spent time with another team before joining Montreal. Stats reflect time with the Canadiens only.

Goaltenders
Note: GP = Games played; TOI = Time on ice (minutes); W = Wins; L = Losses; T = Ties; GA = Goals against; SO = Shutouts; GAA = Goals against average

Transactions
transferred Joe Malone and Jack McDonald to Quebec Bulldogs when the club returned to the NHL, November 25, 1919
signed Don Smith as a free agent, November, 1919
signed Howard McNamara as a free agent, December 5, 1919
signed Eddie Carpenter as a free agent, December 15, 1919
traded Eddie Carpenter to Quebec Bulldogs for Goldie Prodgers, December 21, 1919
traded Goldie Prodgers to Toronto St. Pats for Harry Cameron, January 14, 1920
signed Jack Coughlin as a free agent, February 18, 1920

Source:
 Mouton, p. 153

References

See also
 1919–20 NHL season

Montreal Canadiens seasons
Montreal Canadiens season, 1919-20
Mont